The 2006 Australian Grand Prix (officially the 2006 Formula 1 Foster's Australian Grand Prix) was a Formula One motor race held at the Melbourne Grand Prix Circuit in Albert Park, Melbourne on 2 April 2006. The 57-lap race was the 22nd Australian Grand Prix as part of the World Championship, and the 71st Australian Grand Prix overall. It was also the third round of the 2006 Formula One season; the Australian Grand Prix had been the season opener since 1996, but this race was held later due to the 2006 Commonwealth Games being held in Melbourne at the time of the opening round. A pre-season test scheduled at the Circuit de Barcelona-Catalunya, in Spain from 24–26 February was also rescheduled and moved to the Bahrain International Circuit, in Bahrain. The season was instead opened in Bahrain, and Australia regained its first round of the season slot for 2007. 

The race was won by Renault's Fernando Alonso (Renault's third win from three races), with the McLaren of Kimi Räikkönen second. Ralf Schumacher finished in third place to take the last podium of his career with the Toyota team. Polesitter Jenson Button retired from the race when his engine blew on the final lap. He eventually stopped roughly ten metres from the finish line, losing a points scoring position (fifth place) in the process.

Murray Walker made a return to the commentary box for a one-off with Australia's Network Ten.

When Mark Webber took the lead on lap 21 in his Williams-Cosworth he became the first Australian driver to lead his home Grand Prix since John Bowe led the early laps of the non-championship 1984 race driving a Ralt RT4 Ford.

This was the last race until the 2015 Mexican Grand Prix that neither Ferrari was classified.

Report

Practice and qualifying

Friday drivers
The bottom 6 teams in the 2005 Constructors' Championship and Super Aguri were entitled to run a third car in free practice on Friday. These drivers drove on Friday but did not compete in qualifying or the race.

Race
The race began with an unusual spin of Juan Pablo Montoya as he completed the formation lap. He lined up at the back of the grid, however Fisichella then stalled his engine on the grid, forcing the start to be red-flagged. Fisichella had to start from the pitlane, while Montoya reclaimed his grid position.

As in 2002, the race had a first-lap accident. Felipe Massa was the victim in an incident involving himself, Nico Rosberg and Christian Klien. The Williams and Red Bull effectively sandwiched Massa's Ferrari as the Brazilian attempted to squeeze through a gap too small, pitching him into the wall hard and out of the race. Rosberg returned to the pits without the rear wing. Klien continued the race unharmed.

These incidents called the Safety Car on the very first lap. Fisichella spun but continued, again in the Jones corner. Alonso passed Button when the SC was recalled two laps later, in the start/finish straight.

On the third lap, Christian Klien had some problem with his suspension and crashed the barriers near Clark Chicane, and destroyed his car. Klien went out walking, happily. This crash had left many pieces of debris on the track and the Safety Car went out again to help the stewards clean the zone. When the race continued, Räikkönen attacked Button and gained his place. Montoya tried that as well, though unsuccessful for many laps.

Vitantonio Liuzzi made an exciting pass on Michael Schumacher, by the Sports Centre turn.

The race continued uneventful for another 10 laps when pit stops began with Montoya, Button and Trulli. Alonso and Räikkönen stopped, giving Mark Webber the lead of his home Grand Prix. A gearbox failure then eliminated him.

Another uneventful stint was run until lap 32 when Montoya touched the grass in the Prost turn, but managed to return to the track. Michael Schumacher also had the same grass cross, although the German champion could not make it back and struck the barriers. He himself said that his car was not easy to drive, and that the tires were not warm enough. This incident called the Safety Car for the third time. Many drivers used this SC situation to go to pits. Räikkönen entered just before Montoya, making a queue. Thankfully for the Woking Team there was not much delay.

On lap 35 the Safety Car was off and the race restarted. Alonso had a strategy to give an enormous gap with the SC and slow down the cars behind, and then blasted off and leave Räikkönen and Heidfeld with the trouble of Albers, creating a 3-second gap between the two leading cars.

The 36th lap called the Safety Car once again. Vitantonio Liuzzi had jumped to the grass, crossed the road, bumped the left barrier, crossed the road again and struck the right barrier near Whiteford, leaving his car completely destroyed. The race restarted on lap 40, and Alonso did exactly the same thing and got a little advantage from Räikkönen. After the incident Liuzzi blamed Villeneuve, saying that the Canadian had screwed up one of his best races.

Lap 39 brought another incident to the race. Tiago Monteiro abandoned due to a mechanical problem. Lap 46 took Montoya out of the race as he crossed the kerbs in the curve where Schumacher had had his accident. This caused the car to jump momentarily, causing an electrical problem which forced a total shutdown of the car, thus making him retire.

The Australian Grand Prix was not free of incidents in the last laps. On the very final lap, in the final 2 corners, Jenson Button blew his engine, causing Fisichella right behind him to be covered in oil and struggling to control the car. Button ended up stalling the car about 10 metres from the finish line. He did so deliberately, giving up a points-scoring position, to avoid a 10 place position penalty in the next race.

Alonso wrapped up his tenth career victory, while Räikkönen grabbed the second place on the podium and Ralf Schumacher scored what proved to be the sole podium for Toyota in the season, and ultimately, his final podium in Formula One. This was despite a drive-through penalty for speeding in the pit lane. After the race, the stewards were busy, handing out a reprimand to Takuma Sato for failing to pay attention to blue flags, and a 25-second penalty to Scott Speed for a similar offence, albeit with yellow flags. The American driver was also fined $5000 for using abusive language during a post-race hearing.

Classification

Qualifying

Notes
 – Jacques Villeneuve was handed a 10 place grid penalty following an engine change before qualifying.
 – Jarno Trulli qualified for the final session however did not completed a timed lap due to gearbox problems.
 – Felipe Massa lost control of his Ferrari during the second qualifying session (Q2) after running over a curb through turn 11 and crashing his car into the wall. It also prompted the session to be red flagged for some time.
 – Giancarlo Fisichella stalled causing the first start to be aborted and started the race proper from the pitlane.

Race

Notes
 – Scott Speed finished eighth but had 25 seconds added to his race time for lack of attention to yellow flags.

Championship standings after the race

Drivers' Championship standings

Constructors' Championship standings

 Note: Only the top five positions are included for both sets of standings.

References

External links

 Detailed Australian Grand Prix results (archived)
 Australian Grand Prix result
 FIA's results table (archived)
 Results from The Official Formula 1 Website (archived)

Grand Prix
Australian Grand Prix
Australian Grand Prix
Australian Grand Prix

ms:Grand Prix Australia 2012